All 40 seats in the Senate of Virginia were up for election on November 8, 1983, alongside the Virginia House of Delegates election.

Overall results

See also 
 United States elections, 1983
 Virginia elections, 1983
 Virginia House of Delegates election, 1983

References

Virginia
1983 Virginia elections
Virginia Senate elections